Paul Allen Smith, Jr. (born March 12, 1960) is an American television host, garden designer, conservationist, and lifestyle expert. He is the host of three television programs. P. Allen Smith's Garden Home and P. Allen Smith's Garden to Table are distributed to public television by American Public Television. His 30-minute show Garden Style is syndicated by The Television Syndication Company.  Smith is one of America's most recognized gardening and design experts, providing ideas and guidance through multiple media venues. He is the author of the Garden Home series of books published by Clarkson Potter/Random House, including Bringing the Garden Indoors: Container, Crafts and Bouquets for Every Room and the cookbook, Seasonal Recipes from the Garden, inspired by the abundance of food from his farm and a family of cooks. In 2014, Smith's television shows were successful at the Taste Awards with Smith returning to Little Rock with four Taste Awards. In 2015, Smith was inducted into the Taste Hall of Fame for his significant impact in the world of taste and broadcast entertainment. Garden Home won a 2017 Taste Award for "Best Green or Organic Program".

Life and work
Born in Little Rock, Arkansas, and raised in McMinnville, Tennessee, Smith is a fourth-generation nurseryman and horticulturalist. Inspired by a childhood spent on the farm raising and showing livestock and poultry, he has led a life of promoting good stewardship of the earth. In 2009, Smith founded the Heritage Poultry Conservancy, an organization dedicated to the preservation and support of all threatened breeds of domestic poultry. He attended Hendrix College, graduating in 1983, and received a Rotary International Scholarship to study garden design and history at the University of Manchester in England, where he also studied English gardens that had been visited by John Adams and Thomas Jefferson in the 18th century.

After returning to the United States, he entered the nursery and garden-design business with his family in Little Rock, Arkansas, where he focused on reviving interest in perennials. Smith also became a private tour guide to European gardens and started teaching gardening workshops, which then led to appearances on local television shows.

In the half-hour episodes of P. Allen Smith Garden Home, Smith empowers people to discover their own style and to create beautiful indoor and outdoor living spaces in their own homes. His mission is to connect with people, cultivate health and mindfulness, and ultimately inspire others to live a more natural life. He shares lifestyle trends and stories of people who are making a positive impact in their communities.  Some episodes are filmed at Smith's Arkansas Home, Moss Mountain Farm, near Little Rock, Arkansas.

Smith has also appeared frequently on The Weather Channel, the CBS Early Show, the NBC Today Show and other national TV programs teaching viewers gardening and design techniques. He has also written several books on gardening and contributes pieces to numerous publications.

Smith's design firm, P. Allen Smith & Associates, specializes in estate master planning, garden design and installation, with projects at public institutions, private corporations, and family estates.  He is a former Board Member of the Royal Oak Foundation (the American partner of England's National Trust) and has contributed to preservation efforts at Thomas Jefferson's Monticello and George Washington's Mount Vernon among other historic properties.  He is a Certified Fellow of the Royal Horticultural Society and is an Honorary Member of the Garden Club of America.  Smith received the Garden Club of America's 'Medal of Honor' in 2006 at the GCA's 93rd Annual Meeting Awards Dinner in Denver, Colorado.

Homes
Located in the historic Quapaw Quarter of Little Rock, Arkansas, the original Garden Home is a 1904 Colonial Revival cottage surrounded by a series of garden rooms designed by Smith. He purchased the house for one United States dollar and relocated it to a  vacant lot. The bargain price was contingent on Allen receiving permission from the local historical commission to move the home from its original site and restore it elsewhere in the city. This garden was created to illustrate his 12 principles of design, the basis of his first book in the Garden Home series.

Smith also built Moss Mountain Farm, also known as The Garden Home Retreat, which is located on the banks of the Arkansas River. It encompasses more than 500 acres of land dating back to 1840. The centerpiece is the cottage, built in the American Greek Revival style and constructed in an eco-friendly manner. Directly behind the cottage is the croquet lawn, which is framed by a summer kitchen and art studio. The surrounding garden includes a fountain garden that separates two wings of garden rooms filled with a mix of annuals, herbs, perennials, roses, shrubs and ornamental grasses. Beyond the flower gardens are orchards filled with heritage apple trees, stone fruit and blueberries, a one-acre vegetable garden, a bluebird trail, wildflower fields and a daffodil hill, which overflows with more than 300,000 daffodils blooming each spring. Various outbuildings, from barns to mobile chicken homes, are located throughout the grounds and surrounding pastures. Moss Mountain Farm is open to the public on select days and is available for hosting special events and weddings.

Career highlights
 Host of public television series, P. Allen Smith's Garden Home
 Host of P. Allen Smith's Garden to Table
 Host of P. Allen Smith Gardens

Publications
Smith has authored the following books:

 P. Allen Smith's Garden Home (2003)
 P. Allen Smith's Container Gardens: 60 Container Recipes to Accent Your Garden (2005)
 P. Allen Smith's Colors for the Garden (2006)
 P. Allen Smith's Living in the Garden Home: Connecting the Seasons with Containers, Crafts, and Celebrations (2007)
 P. Allen Smith's Bringing the Garden Indoors: Containers, Crafts, and Bouquets for Every Room (2009)
 P. Allen Smith's Bulb Garden: Colorful Blooms & Lush Foliage (2010)
 P. Allen Smith's Rose Garden: Roses for Every Garden (2010)
 P. Allen Smith's Seasonal Recipes from the Garden (2010)
 P. Allen Smith's Veggies & Herbs: From Garden to Table (2010)

Awards and honors
 Member of the Most Venerable Order of the Hospital of Saint John of Jerusalem
 2017 Taste Award for "Best Green or Organic Program"

References

External links
 P. Allen Smith's Garden Home Website
 P. Allen Smith speaks at the National Book Festival (10/4/2003)
 "The Martha Stewart of the South", Kim Severson, The New York Times, 4 August 2010.

Living people
American television personalities
People from McMinnville, Tennessee
Gardening television
1960 births
Hendrix College alumni
People from Little Rock, Arkansas
Serving Brothers of the Order of St John